The Tiger Cubs are a group of former Tiger Management employees who have since founded their own hedge funds. In addition, there are hedge funds that Tiger Management founder Julian Robertson has invested in known as "Tiger Seeds". Many of the Tiger Cubs are also Tiger Seeds.

Members

Tiger Cubs

Tiger Seeds

See also
Tiger Management
Julian Robertson

References

Tiger Management
Investment management companies of the United States
American hedge fund managers